The women's coxless pairs rowing competition at the 1988 Summer Olympics took place at the Han River Regatta Course in Seoul, Korea. The event was held from 19 to 24 September.

Background

The Romanian rower Rodica Arba had competed in the event since the 1981 season, and dominated it—with different partners—since the 1984 Summer Olympics in Los Angeles, where she won gold with Elena Horvat. She gained the 1985 World Rowing Championships title with Horvat, and won the 1986 and 1987 World Rowing Championships with Olga Homeghi. Arba and Homeghi were the only team favoured to have a chance of winning the event at the 1988 Olympics. The East German rowers were regarded as medal contenders, as they had gained medals in the event at the last three World Championships. Canada were the reigning Pan American champions.

Previous W2- competitions

Results

Heats

Heat 1

Heat 2

Repechage

Heat 1

Heat 2

Finals

B final

A final

Notes

References 

Volume 1 Part 1 – up to page 305
Volume 1 Part 2 – pages 306–587
Volume 1 Part 3 – pages 588–866

Volume 2 Part 1 – up to page 144
Volume 2 Part 2 – pages 145–725

External links

Rowing at the 1988 Summer Olympics
Women's rowing at the 1988 Summer Olympics